Rhenium chloride may refer to:

 Trirhenium nonachloride (rhenium(III) chloride/Rhenium trichloride), Re3Cl9
 Rhenium pentachloride (rhenium(V) chloride), ReCl5
 Rhenium(IV) chloride (rhenium tetrachloride), ReCl4
 Rhenium(VI) chloride (rhenium hexachloride), ReCl6